The following highways are numbered 874:

United States